34th National Board of Review Awards
December 21, 1962
The 34th National Board of Review Awards were announced on December 21, 1962.

Top ten films 
The Longest Day
Billy Budd
The Miracle Worker
Lawrence of Arabia
Long Day's Journey Into Night
Whistle Down the Wind
Requiem for a Heavyweight
A Taste of Honey
Birdman of Alcatraz
War Hunt

Top foreign films 
Sundays and Cybele
Barabbas
Divorce, Italian Style
The Naked Island
Through a Glass Darkly

Winners 
Best Film: The Longest Day
Best Foreign Film: Sundays and Cybele
Best Actor: Jason Robards (Long Day's Journey Into Night, Tender is the Night)
Best Actress: Anne Bancroft (The Miracle Worker)
Best Supporting Actor: Burgess Meredith (Advise and Consent)
Best Supporting Actress: Angela Lansbury (The Manchurian Candidate, All Fall Down)
Best Director: David Lean (Lawrence of Arabia)

External links 
National Board of Review of Motion Pictures :: Awards for 1962

1962
National Board of Review Awards
National Board of Review Awards
National Board of Review Awards
National Board of Review Awards